Al Marconi is an English internationally known performer who plays the Spanish guitar instrument in World fusion, Contemporary classical music and Latin music (genre)s. He is an independent recording artist, composer and producer with YouTube views of more than 60 million. "Porcelain Rose", a track from his Terra Nova album has achieved over 10,000,000 views while "Dark Gypsy" has been viewed on more than 7,000,000 occasions.

Discography
1997: Equilibrium
1999: Monument
2000: Esperanto
2007: Terra Nova
2011: Insomnia
2015: Alchemy
2018: Heartstrings

References

1969 births
Living people
English classical guitarists
English male guitarists
Acoustic guitarists
Musicians from Plymouth, Devon